Mian Mahalleh-ye Gafsheh (also Romanized as Mīān Maḩalleh-ye Gafsheh; also known as Mīān Gafsheh) is a village in Gafsheh-ye Lasht-e Nesha Rural District, Lasht-e Nesha District, Rasht County, Gilan Province, Iran. At the 2006 census, its population was 583, in 192 families.

References 

Populated places in Rasht County